Dutton Animal Book Award was an American literary award established in 1963 by publisher E. P. Dutton to recognize a previously unpublished work of fiction or non-fiction relating to animals. The reward for the winner was a $7,500 to $15,000 advanced against royalties after publication of the book by Dutton. The award was inspired by the success of Gavin Maxwell's Ring of Bright Water (1960), the story of two otters. The award was presented between 1963 and 1969; there was a 6-year hiatus with one more award presented in 1975.

Winners
1963: Sterling North, Rascal
1964: Robert William Murphy, The Pond
1965: Walt Morey, Gentle Ben
1966: Faith McNulty, The Whooping Crane: The Bird That Defies Extinction
1967: Daniel P. Mannix, The Fox and the Hound
1968: Walt Morey, Kävik the Wolf Dog 
1969: Sterling North, The Wolfling
1970–74: no award
1975: Dayton Hyde, Strange Companion

References

Awards established in 1963
Awards disestablished in 1975
Literary awards honoring unpublished books or writers
American fiction awards
American non-fiction literary awards
Animal characters in literature
E. P. Dutton